The Yale Child Study Center is a department at the Yale University School of Medicine. The center conducts research and provides clinical services and medical training related to children and families. Topics of investigation include autism and related disorders, Tourette syndrome, other pediatric mental health concerns, parenting, and neurobiology.

Mission 
The center conducts research and provides clinical services and medical training related to children and families.  Topics of investigation include autism spectrum disorders, Tourette syndrome, other pediatric mental health concerns, parenting, and neurobiology.

History 
The center was started in 1911 as the Yale Clinic of Child Development by Arnold Gesell. Dr. Gesell, who is considered the father of child development in the United States, led the center until 1948. Subsequent directors were:
 Milton J.E. Senn,  1948–1966
 Albert J. Solnit, 1966–1983
 Donald J. Cohen, 1983–2001
 John E. Schowalter, (interim) 2001–2002
 Alan E. Kazdin, 2002–2006
 Fred R. Volkmar, 2006–2014
 Linda C. Mayes, (interim) 2014–2016; Director 2016-present

References

Further reading
 
 Mayes LC (2015).  Vision(s) for the Yale Child Study Center

External links

Child Study Center
Yale School of Medicine
Child-related organizations in the United States
Autism-related organizations in the United States
Organizations established in 1911
1911 establishments in Connecticut